Kamna Gorica may refer to several places in Slovenia: 

Kamna Gorca, a settlement in the Municipality of Rogaška Slatina
Kamna Gorica, Ljubljana, a former village in the City Municipality of Ljubljana
Kamna Gorica, Radovljica, a settlement in the Municipality of Radovljica